Dore Kiesselbach is an American poet.

Biography
He graduated from Oberlin College in 1988, and the University of Iowa.
His work has appeared in Agni, Antioch Review, Field, Poetry, Poetry Review (UK), and other magazines.

He is married to Karin Ciano; they live in Minneapolis.

Awards
2014 Robert H. Winner Memorial Award
2011 Agnes Lynch Starrett Poetry Prize
2009 Bridport Prize

Works
Albatross, University of Pittsburgh Press (2017)
Salt Pier, University of Pittsburgh Press (2012)
"Albatross," a series, Plume
"Hickey", Poetry Society of America
"Catafalque", AGNI Online
"Aubade", American Life in Poetry
"Crucifixion", Plume
"Turkey Fallen Dead From Tree", Poetry
"The Painted Hall, Lascaux", Waywiser Press

References

External links
Author website

Agnes Lynch Starrett Poetry Prize winners
American male poets
Oberlin College alumni
University of Iowa alumni
Living people
Year of birth missing (living people)